This article describes the qualification for the 2016 European Women's Handball Championship.

Qualification system
The draw was held in Vienna, Austria on 24 March 2015 at 11:30 local time. Sweden as host nation was directly qualified.
32 teams had registered for participation and compete for 14 places at the final tournament in 2 distinct Qualification Phases. The group winners of phase 1 advanced to phase 2. The 28 teams were divided into seven groups of four teams. The top two teams qualified for the main tournament as well as the best-ranked third placed team, where the results against the last-placed team were revoked.

Qualification Phase 1
The groups played in a tournament format from 12–14 June 2015. The group winners advanced to the second phase.

Group A

Group B

Qualification Phase 2
The draw was held on 9 April 2015 in Kristianstad, Sweden.

Seeding

Group 1

Group 2

Group 3

Group 4

Group 5

Group 6

Group 7

Ranking of third-placed teams
To determine the best third-placed teams from the qualifying group stage which qualified directly for the final tournament, only the results against the first, and second-placed teams in their group were taken into account, while results against the fourth-placed team were not included. As a result, four matches played by each third-placed team counted for the purposes of determining the ranking.

References

Notes

External links
 Eurohandball.com 

Qualification
Europe Women's Championship qualification
Europe Women's Championship qualification